

Heinz Fiebig (23 March 1897 – 30 March 1964) was a German general in the Wehrmacht of Nazi Germany during World War II who may have been a recipient of the Knight's Cross of the Iron Cross of Nazi Germany.

Awards 

 Nominated for the Knight's Cross of the Iron Cross on 8 May 1945 as Generalmajor and commander of 84. Infanterie-Division

Heinz Fiebigs nomination by the Heerespersonalamt (HPA—Army Staff Office) was ready for signature at the end of the war. According to the Association of Knight's Cross Recipients (AKCR) the award was presented in accordance with the Dönitz-decree. This is illegal according to the Deutsche Dienststelle (WASt) and lacks legal justification. The presentation date is an assumption of the AKCR.

References

Citations

Bibliography

 
 

1897 births
1964 deaths
People from Zabrze
People from the Province of Silesia
Major generals of the German Army (Wehrmacht)
German Army personnel of World War I
Prussian Army personnel
Recipients of the clasp to the Iron Cross, 1st class
Recipients of the Gold German Cross
Recipients of the Knight's Cross of the Iron Cross
German prisoners of war in World War II held by the United Kingdom
Reichswehr personnel